Henley-on-Thames is a town and civil parish on the River Thames in Oxfordshire, England,  northeast of Reading,  west of Maidenhead,  southeast of Oxford and  west of London (by road), near the tripoint of Oxfordshire, Berkshire and Buckinghamshire. The population at the 2011 Census was 12,186.

History
Henley does not appear in Domesday Book of 1086; often it is mistaken for Henlei in the book which is in Surrey.
There is archaeological evidence of people residing in Henley since the second century as part of the Romano-British period. The first record of Henley as a substantial settlement is from 1179, when it is recorded that King Henry II "had bought land for the making of buildings". King John granted the manor of Benson and the town and manor of Henley to Robert Harcourt in 1199. A church at Henley is first mentioned in 1204. In 1205 the town received a tax for street paving, and in 1234 the bridge is first mentioned. In 1278 Henley is described as a hamlet of Benson with a chapel. The street plan was probably established by the end of the 13th century.  As a demesne of the crown it was granted in 1337 to John de Molyns, whose family held it for about 250 years.

The existing Thursday market, it is believed, was granted by a charter of King John. A market was certainly in existence by 1269; however, the jurors of the assize of 1284 said that they did not know by what warrant the Earl of Cornwall held a market and fair in the town of Henley. The existing Corpus Christi fair was granted by a charter of Henry VI. During the Black Death pandemic that swept through England in the 14th century, Henley lost 60% of its population. A variation on its name can be seen as "Henley up a Tamys" in 1485. 

By the beginning of the 16th century, the town extended along the west bank of the Thames from Friday Street in the south to the Manor, now Phyllis Court, in the north and took in Hart Street and New Street. To the west, it included Bell Street and the Market Place. Henry VIII granted the use of the titles "mayor" and "burgess", and the town was incorporated in 1568 in the name of the warden, portreeves, burgesses and commonalty. The original charter was issued by Elizabeth I but replaced by one from George I in 1722.

Henley suffered at the hands of both parties in the Civil War. Later, William III rested here on his march to London in 1688, at the nearby recently rebuilt Fawley Court, and received a deputation from the Lords. The town's period of prosperity in the 17th and 18th centuries was due to manufactures of glass and malt, and trade in corn and wool. Henley-on-Thames supplied London with timber and grain. A workhouse to accommodate 150 people was built at West Hill in Henley in 1790, and was later enlarged to accommodate 250 as the Henley Poor Law Union workhouse. 

Prior to 1974 Henley was a municipal borough with a Borough Council comprising twelve Councillors and four Aldermen, headed by a Mayor. The Local Government Act 1972 resulted in the re-organisation of local government in that year. Henley became part of Wallingford District Council, subsequently renamed South Oxfordshire District Council. The borough council was replaced by a town council but the role of mayor was retained.

Landmarks and structures

Henley Bridge is a five arched bridge across the river built in 1786. It is a Grade I listed historic structure. During 2011 the bridge underwent a £200,000 repair programme after being hit by the boat Crazy Love in August 2010. Henley Town Hall, which maintains a prominent position in the Market Place, was designed by Henry Hare and completed in 1900. Chantry House is the second Grade I listed building in the town. It is unusual in having more storeys on one side than on the other. The Church of England parish church of St Mary the Virgin is nearby and has a 16th-century tower. The Old Bell is a pub in the centre of Henley on Bell Street. The building has been dated from 1325: the oldest-dated building in the town. To celebrate Queen Victoria's Diamond Jubilee, 60 oak trees were planted in the shape of a Victoria Cross near Fairmile, the long straight road to the northwest of the town. Two notable buildings just outside Henley, in Buckinghamshire, are:

Fawley Court, a red-brick building designed by Christopher Wren for William Freeman (1684) with subsequent interior remodelling by James Wyatt and landscaping by Lancelot "Capability" Brown.
Greenlands, which took its present form when owned by W. H. Smith and is now home to Henley Business School

Property
Lloyds Bank's analysis of house price growth in 125 market towns in England over the year to June 2016 (using Land Registry data), found that Henley was the second-most expensive market town in the country with an average property price of £748,001.

Transport
The town's railway station is the terminus of the Henley Branch Line from Twyford. In the past there have been direct services to London Paddington. There are express mainline rail services from Reading to Paddington. Trains from High Wycombe go to London Marylebone. There are two bus services that runs from Reading through to High Wycombe via Henley. They are the 800 and the 850 bus service.

Well-known institutions and organisations
The River and Rowing Museum, located in Mill Meadows, is the town's one museum. It was established in 1998, and officially opened by Queen Elizabeth II. The museum, designed by the architect David Chipperfield, features information on the River Thames, the sport of rowing, and the town of Henley itself. The University of Reading's Henley Business School is near Henley, as is Henley College. Rupert House School is a preparatory school located in Bell Street.

Rowing
Henley is a world-renowned centre for rowing. Each summer the Henley Royal Regatta is held on Henley Reach, a naturally straight stretch of the river just north of the town. It was extended artificially. The event became "Royal" in 1851, when Prince Albert became patron of the regatta. Other regattas and rowing races are held on the same reach, including Henley Women's Regatta, the Henley Boat Races for women's and lightweight teams between Oxford University and Cambridge University, Henley Town and Visitors Regatta, Henley Veteran Regatta, Upper Thames Small Boats Head, Henley Fours and Eights Head, and Henley Sculls. These "Heads" often attract strong crews that have won medals at National Championships. Local rowing clubs include:

 Henley Rowing Club (located upstream of Henley Bridge)
 Leander Club (world-famous, home to Olympic and World Champions, most notably Steve Redgrave and Matthew Pinsent, near Henley Bridge)
 Phyllis Court Rowing Club (part of the Phyllis Court Club and set up for recreational rowing)
 Upper Thames Rowing Club (located just upstream from the  mark/Fawley/Old Blades)
 Henley Whalers (associated with UTRC) focus on fixed-seat rowing and sailing.

The regatta depicted throughout Dead in the Water, an episode of the British detective television series Midsomer Murders, was filmed at Henley.

Other sports
Henley has the oldest football team Henley Town F.C. recognised by the Oxfordshire Football Association, they play at The Triangle ground. Henley also has a rugby union club Henley Hawks which play at the Dry Leas ground, a hockey club Henley Hockey Club which play at Jubilee Park, and Henley Cricket Club which has played at Brakspear Ground since 1886. a new club in Henley was started in September 2016 called Henley Lions FC.

Notable people

 Gerry Anderson MBE (1929–2012), creator of Sixties television series Thunderbirds lived in Henley-on-Thames.
 Sir Martyn Arbib led the Perpetual fund management company during the late 20th century, unusually based in Henley-on-Thames, rather than London. Arbib was a major benefactor in the establishment of the River and Rowing Museum at Henley, which opened in 1998.
 Mary Berry, food writer and television presenter, lives in Henley.
 Mary Blandy (1720–1752) lived at Blandy House her family's home in Henley, now a dental surgery. In 1752, she was hanged for the murder, by poisoning, of her father, Francis Blandy who had opposed her engagement to a Scottish man who was already married. She proclaimed on the day of the hanging in Oxford: "Gentlemen, don't hang me high for the sake of decency". Mary is buried with her parents at St Mary The Virgin's Church, despite that being forbidden at the time for a murderer. She is said to haunt the Kenton Theatre, the family house and St Mary's churchyard.
 James Blish (1921–1975), American science fiction writer, lived in Henley from 1968 until his death.
 Jonathan Bowden (1962–2012) lived in Rotherfield Peppard (post town Henley-on-Thames) throughout the 1970s.
 Russell Brand, English comedian, actor and activist, lives in Henley-on-Thames.
 Ross Brawn, British engineer best known for his role as the technical director of the Scuderia Ferrari f1 team and former team principal of Mercedes Grand Prix.
 Winston Churchill led the Queen's Own Oxfordshire Hussars, (C Squadron) who were based at "The White House" on Market Place in 1908 and some years after that.
 Dame Gladys Cooper (1888–1971), actress, spent her last years in Henley. In an acting career spanning seven decades she appeared on stage (the West End and Broadway), in film, and on television, and was twice nominated for an Academy Award. 
 Sir Frank Crisp (1843–1919), first baronet, lawyer and microscopist, the ideator of Friar Park. The "Ballad of Sir Frankie Crisp (Let It Roll)" composed by the former Beatle George Harrison, who purchased Friar Park from Sir Frank, is dedicated to him.
 Esther Deuzeville (1786–1851), as Esther Copley later a writer of children's books and works on domestic economy addressed to the working people, lived here with her parents until her marriage in 1809. There is a plaque to her and her family in the United Reformed Church.
 Charles-François Dumouriez (1739–1823), French general, is buried at St Mary the Virgin parish church.
 Humphrey Gainsborough (1718–1776), brother of the artist Thomas Gainsborough, was a pastor and inventor who lived in Henley. A blue plaque marks his house, "The Manse".
 George Harrison (1943–2001), musician and former Beatle, purchased Friar Park in 1970, and lived there until his death. During his years there, he restored the buildings and gardens. His widow, Olivia Harrison, continues to live on the estate. George and Olivia's only child, Dhani Harrison was raised at Friar Park.  
 Michael Heseltine, Baron Heseltine of Thenford, preceded Boris Johnson as Conservative MP for Henley-on-Thames.
 Tony Hall, Baron Hall of Birkenhead lives in Henley-on-Thames.
 Sir William Hamilton (1730–1803), British diplomat, antiquarian, archaeologist and vulcanologist was born in Henley-on-Thames.
 John Hunt, Baron Hunt of Fawley (1905–1987) had a house in Henley, where he lived from his retirement until his death.
 Boris Johnson, politician, was the Member of Parliament and the Prime Minister of the United Kingdom, as well as the Mayor of London.
 Simon Kernick, author, was raised in Henley-on-Thames.
 William Lenthall (1591–1662), politician, was born in Henley-on-Thames. He was Speaker of the House of Commons between 1640 and 1660.
 Hugo Nicolson, music producer. 
 Jack Ogden, jewellery historian, lives in Henley-on-Thames.
 George Orwell (1903–1950), author, spent some of his formative years in Henley-on-Thames.
 Andrew Peach, broadcaster, lives in Henley with his wife and two children.
 Lee Ryan, singer, lives in Henley.
 Marcus du Sautoy, mathematician, lives in Henley.
 Phillip Schofield, TV presenter, lives in Henley with his wife and two daughters.
 Urs Schwarzenbach, financier, lives at Culham Court, Aston, east of Henley.
 Dame Stephanie Shirley, entrepreneur, philanthropist and workplace revolutionary, lives in Henley with her husband.
 Dusty Springfield (1939–1999), singer, is buried in the grounds of St Mary the Virgin parish church. Her ashes were scattered in Henley and at the Cliffs of Moher in Ireland. Each year her fans gather in Henley to celebrate "Dusty Day" on the closest Sunday to her birthday (16 April).
 Sir Ninian Stephen, Australian judge and Governor-General of Australia (1982–1989), was born in Henley
 Harry Stott, joint winner of I'd Do Anything and star of TV show Roman Mysteries.
 David Tomlinson (1917–2000), actor, was born and raised in Henley.
 Andrew Tristem, author and journalist, lives in Henley-on-Thames. 
 Jonathan Lloyd Walker, actor, was born and raised here. He now lives in West Vancouver, Canada.

Media
Henley's local newspaper is the Henley Standard.  BBC Radio Berkshire (94.6,95.4,104.1,104.4), Heart Berkshire (97.0, 102.9, 103.4), Reading 107 (107.0), all broadcast from Reading, serve an area including Henley, as does Time 106.6 broadcast from Slough. London's radio stations such as Capital FM and Magic 105.4 along with a few others can also be received. Regatta Radio (87.7) was broadcast during Henley Royal Regatta for a number of years up to 2014. As Henley is on an overlap of TV regions, it is possible to receive signals from both BBC London and BBC South transmitters, as well as ITV London and ITV Meridian. However, the local relay transmitter for Henley only broadcasts programmes from ITV and BBC London, making Henley the only part of Oxfordshire included within the London television region.

In popular culture 
Henley-on-Thames was represented in the 2010 American drama film The Social Network as the site of a rowing competition between the US and the Netherlands.

Twin towns/Sister cities
Henley is twinned with:
  Bled, Slovenia
  Falaise, Calvados, France
  Leichlingen, Germany
  Borama, Somaliland

See also
Brakspear Brewery, founded in 1779 but now moved to Witney
Henley Festival, held each July
Henley shirt, a garment named after the town because it was the traditional uniform of the rowing clubs
Stuart Turner Ltd, Henley-based engineering company founded in 1906

References

Bibliography

External links

 Henley-on-Thames online

 
Civil parishes in Oxfordshire
Populated places on the River Thames
Rowing venues in the United Kingdom
Market towns in Oxfordshire